Michel Albert Jean Joseph Ybarnégaray (16 October 1883 – 25 April 1956) was a French Basque politician and founder of the International Federation of Basque Pelota.

Jean Ybarnegaray was born in Uhart-Cize, Department of Pyrénées-Atlantiques, then called Basses Pyrénées, in the Northern Basque Country. He studied law at the Sorbonne and Bordeaux University and practised as a lawyer. He was elected to the Chamber of Deputies in April 1914.

On the outbreak of the First World War, he was recalled to service. He was wounded and discharged from the army with the Légion d'honneur, returning to the Chamber of Deputies, where he criticised the Nivelle Offensive of 1917, the armistice of 1918 and the Treaty of Versailles.

A member of the Republican Federation, Ybarnegaray joined the French Social Party of François de La Rocque in 1938. He served as Minister of State in Paul Reynaud's government from 10 May 1940. On arrival of refugees from the Basque (1937) and Catalan fronts (1939) in the Spanish Civil War, Ybarnegaray took a hostile stance against the exiles, labeling them as "reds" and turned a cold shoulder to Basque nationalism or any Basque political approach.

He served in the Vichy government, as Minister of State in the first government of Marshal Philippe Pétain and as Minister for Veterans and the Family in the second Pétain government. He resigned his office on 6 September 1940.

Ybarnegaray had undertaken French Resistance activities, assisting escapees in crossing the Pyrenees, for which he was arrested in 1943, and detained in Plansee in the state of Tyrol. Although he was sentenced after the war to losing civil rights, his Resistance activities resulted in the sentence being suspended.

He died in Paris on 25 April 1956.

References

 

1883 births
1956 deaths
People from Lower Navarre
Politicians from Nouvelle-Aquitaine
Republican Federation politicians
Republican Independents
French Social Party politicians
Government ministers of France
French Ministers of Veterans Affairs
Members of the 11th Chamber of Deputies of the French Third Republic
Members of the 12th Chamber of Deputies of the French Third Republic
Members of the 13th Chamber of Deputies of the French Third Republic
Members of the 14th Chamber of Deputies of the French Third Republic
Members of the 15th Chamber of Deputies of the French Third Republic
Members of the 16th Chamber of Deputies of the French Third Republic
University of Paris alumni
University of Bordeaux alumni
Basque collaborators with Nazi Germany
French military personnel of World War I
Chevaliers of the Légion d'honneur
People from the Northern Basque Country